Herford is a town in North Rhine-Westphalia, Germany.

Herford may also refer to:

Herford (district), a district in North Rhine-Westphalia
Herford – Minden-Lübbecke II
Herford (surname)
, a 1996 cargo ship
SC Herford, a German football team

See also
Herfordia (disambiguation)
Hereford (disambiguation)
Hendford (disambiguation)
Headford, County Galway, Ireland